The Killing Kind may refer to:

 The Killing Kind (album), by Overkill
 The Killing Kind (1973 film), by Curtis Harrington
 Mr In-Between, a 2001 British crime drama film released in the U.S. as The Killing Kind